The 2021 Mid-American Conference football season was the 76th season for the Mid-American Conference (MAC), as part of the 2021 NCAA Division I FBS football season.

The provisional schedule was released on February 26, 2021. The season was scheduled to begin September 2, 2021, and ended with the MAC Football Championship Game on December 4, 2021.

Previous season
 
The 2020 Mid-American Conference football season saw a delayed start and shortened season due to the COVID-19 pandemic, with only 6 regular season games. The Buffalo Bulls won the East Division, while the Ball State Cardinals won the West Division. In the 2020 MAC Championship Game, the Cardinals defeated the Bulls 38–28. The Cardinals would go on to the Arizona Bowl, where they defeated the San Jose State Spartans 34–13.

Preseason

Preseason Media Poll
The Preseason Media Poll was announced on July 20. Kent State was voted the favorite to win the East Division, while Ball State was voted as favorite for the West Division. Ball State was also the favorite to win the conference championship game.

Preseason awards
The following list contains MAC players included on watch lists for national awards.

Head Coaches
Lance Leipold, who had been head coach of Buffalo since 2015, left the MAC to take the head coach position with the Kansas Jayhawks of the Big 12 Conference. Leipold was replaced by interim head coach Rob Ianello during the school's search for a new permanent coach. However, Ianello and several other Buffalo assistant coaches were tabbed to join Leipold at Kansas, leaving a temporary vacancy at the team's head coaching position. Michigan co-defensive coordinator Maurice Linguist was later hired as Buffalo's new permanent coach.

On July 14, Frank Solich announced his retirement from the head coach position at Ohio after 16 seasons with the school. Tim Albin was promoted to head coach to fill Solich's vacancy.

Mid-season changes
On November 4, Tom Arth was fired as head coach at Akron after posting a 3–24 record with the school in 3 years. Oscar Rodriguez, who was formerly the school's inside linebacker coach and associate head coach, was named interim head coach. On December 4, the school announced Oregon offensive coordinator Joe Moorhead as the new permanent head coach.

Rankings

Schedule

All times Eastern time.

Week 1

Week 2

Week 3

Week 4

Week 5

Week 6

Week 7

Week 8

Week 9

Week 10

Week 11

Week 12

Week 13

MAC Conference Championship Game

Postseason

Bowl Games

Central Michigan was originally slated to play in the Arizona Bowl on December 31 against Boise State, but the bowl was cancelled when Boise State was forced to withdraw due to a COVID-19 outbreak within their team. Central Michigan was then invited to play in the Sun Bowl on the same date to replace Miami (FL), who had withdrawn from that bowl due to COVID-19 as well.

MAC records vs other conferences

2021–2022 records against non-conference foes:

Mid-American vs Power 5 matchups
This is a list of games the MAC has scheduled versus power conference teams (ACC, Big 10, Big 12, Pac-12, BYU, Notre Dame and SEC). All rankings are from the current AP Poll at the time of the game.

Mid-American vs Group of Five matchups
The following games include MAC teams competing against teams from the American, C-USA, Mountain or Sun Belt.

Mid-American vs FBS independents matchups
The following games include MAC  teams competing against FBS Independents, which includes Army, Liberty, New Mexico State, UConn, or UMass.

Mid-American vs FCS matchups

Awards and honors

Player of the week honors

East Division

West Division

MAC Individual Awards
The following individuals received postseason honors as voted by the Mid-American Conference football coaches at the end of the season.

All-Conference Teams
The following players were listed as part of the All-Conference teams.

All-Americans

The 2021 College Football All-America Teams are composed of the following College Football All-American first teams chosen by the following selector organizations: Associated Press (AP), Football Writers Association of America (FWAA), American Football Coaches Association (AFCA), Walter Camp Foundation (WCFF), The Sporting News (TSN), Sports Illustrated (SI), USA Today (USAT) ESPN, CBS Sports (CBS), FOX Sports (FOX) College Football News (CFN), Bleacher Report (BR), Scout.com, Phil Steele (PS), SB Nation (SB), Athlon Sports, Pro Football Focus (PFF) and Yahoo! Sports (Yahoo!).

Currently, the NCAA compiles consensus all-America teams in the sports of Division I-FBS football and Division I men's basketball using a point system computed from All-America teams named by coaches associations or media sources.  The system consists of three points for a first-team honor, two points for second-team honor, and one point for third-team honor.  Honorable mention and fourth team or lower recognitions are not accorded any points.  Football consensus teams are compiled by position and the player accumulating the most points at each position is named first team consensus all-American.  Currently, the NCAA recognizes All-Americans selected by the AP, AFCA, FWAA, TSN, and the WCFF to determine Consensus and Unanimous All-Americans. Any player named to the First Team by all five of the NCAA-recognized selectors is deemed a Unanimous All-American.

NFL Draft

The following list includes all MAC players who were drafted in the 2022 NFL Draft.

References